Ronald E. Miller (born September 20, 1951) is a Republican former member of the Pennsylvania House of Representatives for the 93rd District and was elected in 1998. He served on the House Appropriations, Transportation and Veterans Affairs and Emergency Preparedness Committees.

Personal
He was raised in Loganville and graduated from Dallastown Area High School. He later attended the Mansfield University of Pennsylvania, where he earned a bachelor of science degree in secondary education. He and his wife live in Jacobus.

References

External links
Representative Miller's official web site
Pennsylvania House profile

1951 births
Living people
Republican Party members of the Pennsylvania House of Representatives
People from York County, Pennsylvania
Politicians from York, Pennsylvania
21st-century American politicians